In complex analysis, a branch of mathematics, the Gauss–Lucas theorem gives a geometric relation between the roots of a polynomial  and the roots of its derivative . The set of roots of a real or complex polynomial is a set of points in the complex plane. When  has a single root then this convex hull is a single point and when the roots lie on a line then the convex hull is a segment of this line. The Gauss–Lucas theorem, named after Carl Friedrich Gauss and Félix Lucas, is similar in spirit to Rolle's theorem.

Formal statement
If  is a (nonconstant) polynomial with complex coefficients, all zeros of  belong to the convex hull of the set of zeros of .

Special cases 
In that case, the convex hull is the line segment with the two roots as endpoints and it is clear that the average of the roots is the middle point of the segment.

In addition, if a polynomial of degree  of real coefficients has  distinct real zeros  we see, using Rolle's theorem, that the zeros of the derivative polynomial are in the interval  which is the convex hull of the set of roots.

The convex hull of the roots of the polynomial

particularly includes the point

Proof 
Over the complex numbers,  is a product of linear factors

Let  be any complex number for which  Then we have for the logarithmic derivative

or

This may also be written as
 

If  then

See also 

 Marden's theorem
 Bôcher's theorem
 Sendov's conjecture
 Routh–Hurwitz theorem
 Hurwitz's theorem (complex analysis)
 Descartes' rule of signs
 Rouché's theorem
 Properties of polynomial roots
 Cauchy interlacing theorem

Notes

References 
 
 .
 
 Craig Smorynski: MVT: A Most Valuable Theorem. Springer, 2017, ISBN 978-3-319-52956-1, pp. 411–414

External links 

 
 Lucas–Gauss Theorem by Bruce Torrence, the Wolfram Demonstrations Project.
 Gauss-Lucas theorem as interactive illustration

Convex analysis
Articles containing proofs
Theorems in complex analysis
Theorems about polynomials